The 2018 FIBA U20 European Championship was the 21st edition of the FIBA U20 European Championship. The competition took place in Chemnitz, Germany from 14 to 22 July 2018. Israel U20 became the European champions for the first time.

Participating teams
  (Runners-up, 2017 FIBA U20 European Championship Division B)

  (3rd place, 2017 FIBA U20 European Championship Division B)

 

  (Winners, 2017 FIBA U20 European Championship Division B)

Venues

First round
In this round, the 16 teams are allocated in four groups of four teams each. All teams will advance to the Second Round of 16.

All times are local (UTC+2).

Group A

Group B

Group C

Group D

Final round

Bracket

Round of 16

Quarterfinals

Semifinals

Third place match

Final

5th–8th place classification

9th–16th place classification

Final standings

Awards

Most Valuable Player

All-Tournament Team
  Mate Kalajžić
  Kostja Mushidi
  Yovel Zoosman
  Deni Avdija
  Filip Stanić

See also
2018 FIBA U20 European Championship Division B

References

External links
 FIBA official website

FIBA U20 European Championship
2018–19 in European basketball
2018–19 in German basketball
2018 in youth sport
International youth basketball competitions hosted by Germany
Sport in Chemnitz
July 2018 sports events in Europe
July 2018 sports events in Germany